This is a list of all the United States Supreme Court cases from volume 368 of the United States Reports:

External links

1961 in United States case law
1962 in United States case law